The list of ship decommissionings in 1910 includes a chronological list of all ships decommissioned in 1910.


See also 

1910
 Ship decommissionings
Ships